Hinithun is a 1997 Maldivian drama film directed by Amjad Ibrahim. Produced by Villager Maldives, the film stars Ismail Hilmy and Jamsheedha Ahmed in pivotal roles.

Premise
During the labor to her only child, Waseema (Aminadidi) was advised to avoid further pregnancy considering her health condition. In a trip to an island, the couple adopts an underprivilege boy, Shamin (Ismail Hilmy) who grows up with love and fortune with their daughter, Areesha (Jamsheedha Ahmed). Years later, Areesha was diagnosed as a heart patient which led the parents to slowly ignore Shamin and become solely focused on Areesha. Citing their financial incapability, the family requests Shamin to leave them and relocate to another house. Areesha, having no connection with Shamin, starts dating his best friend, Shiham while Shamin is seem to be in love with Areesha.

Cast 
 Ismail Hilmy as Shamin
 Jamsheedha Ahmed as Areesha
 Hussain Mahir as Shiham
 Mariyam Rizla
 Mariyam Nisha (Voice-over for the character Neema)
 Aminadidi as Waseema
 Shahzaadha
 Zulfiqar
 Hussain Rushdee
 Aminath Rushdee
 Mariyam Rushdee
 Sameema
 Suneetha Ali (Special appearance in the song "Khiyaal Gehlunee Hey?")

Soundtrack

References

Maldivian drama films
1997 films
Films directed by Amjad Ibrahim
1997 drama films
Dhivehi-language films